Solomon Rubinstein (1868 in Poland – 27 November 1931 in Los Angeles, United States) was a Polish–American chess master.

Born in Poland, he left his native country for the United States. He tied for 10-11th in the American National Chess Masters Tournament at New York 1913 (José Raúl Capablanca won).

References

External links
 Chessgames.com :: Solomon Rubinstein
 Chessmetrics Player Profile :: Solomon Rubinstein

1868 births
1931 deaths
Polish chess players
American chess players
Jewish chess players
American people of Polish-Jewish descent
Place of birth missing